Erna Havelka (born 19 September 1944) is a former Croatian-Yugoslavian gymnast. She competed at the 1972 Summer Olympics.

References

External links
 

1944 births
Living people
Croatian female artistic gymnasts
Olympic gymnasts of Yugoslavia
Gymnasts at the 1972 Summer Olympics
Sportspeople from Zagreb